Pygmaeocereus is a genus of diminutive cacti (family Cactaceae).

It is native to South America.

Species

References 

 
Trichocereeae
Cacti of South America
Cactoideae genera